Milecastle 22 (Portgate) was a milecastle of the Roman Hadrian's Wall. Its remains exist as a low, turf covered platform just east of the Portgate roundabout (junction of the A68 and B6318).

Construction 
Milecastle 22 was assumed to be a long-axis milecastle, and had Type III gateways (only the north gateway has been identified).  Such milecastles were thought to have been constructed by the legio VI Victrix who were based in Eboracum (York).

It was constructed with Narrow Walls with a Standard B offset.

It has been suggested that this is due to the proximity of the Portgate, rendering the milecastle redundant as a means of passage through the wall.

Excavations and investigations
The internal width and the north gateway's type were also established. It was also discovered that the north gateway had been blocked.

1966 – English Heritage Field Investigation.  The location was confirmed.  It was also noted that the remains consisted of a slight earthen platform, considerably spread by cultivation.
1989 – English Heritage Field Investigation.  It was noted that the milecastle survived as a squarish turf-covered platform, 0.5m high on the east side, but elsewhere as a parch mark only.
1992 – The eastern part of the south wall was unearthed, standing five courses high.

Associated turrets 
Each milecastle on Hadrian's Wall had two associated turret structures.  These turrets were positioned approximately one-third and two-thirds of a Roman mile to the west of the Milecastle, and would probably have been manned by part of the milecastle's garrison.  The turrets associated with Milecastle 22 are known as Turret 22A and Turret 22B.

Situated between Milecastle 22 and Turret 22A is a structure known as the Portgate.  This was a major gateway, allowing Dere Street to pass through the line of the Hadrian's Wall.

Turret 22A
Turret 22A (Portgate) is (all but the south wall) buried beneath the Military Road. The south wall is under a fence immediately to the south of the road and does not project into the field. Excavation in 1930 revealed that the masonry was four courses high on the west side and three on the east.  The turret is of Standard A construction, indicating a change of builder since Milecastle 22.

In 1850, a stone was found in the vicinity inscribed with the words  ("the lightning of the gods").  It is thought that this was set up where lightning had struck.

Location on Ordnance Survey 1:25 000 map:

Turret 22B
Turret 22B (Stanley) was located in 1930, alongside the Military Road,  to the west of the lane leading to Portgate Farm.  There are no visible remains, the site being mainly covered by a modern road.

The vallum around the area of Turret 22B was particularly well preserved, causing William Hutton to write 
 

Location on Ordnance Survey 1:25 000 map:

Monument records

References

Bibliography

22
Corbridge